The 2008 KNSB Dutch Single Distance Championships took place in Heerenveen at the Thialf ice rink on 26–28 October 2007. Although this tournament was held in 2007 it was the 2008 edition as it was part of the 2007–2008 speed skating season.

Schedule

Medalists

Men

Source: www.schaatsen.nl  & SchaatsStatistieken.nl

Women

Source: www.schaatsen.nl  & SchaatsStatistieken.nl

External links 
 Official Site

References

Knsb Dutch Single Distance Championships, 2008
KNSB Dutch Allround Championships
Dutch Speed Skating Championships
KNSB Dutch Single Distance Championships, 2008